Janta College is a college in Bakewar, Etawah district, Uttar Pradesh, India. It is affiliated to Chhatrapati Shahu Ji Maharaj University (formerly Kanpur University).

Notable alumni
 Premdas Katheria, former Member of Parliament

References

External links
 Official website

Universities and colleges in Etawah district
Colleges affiliated to Chhatrapati Shahu Ji Maharaj University
Kanpur division
Educational institutions established in 1959
1959 establishments in Uttar Pradesh